Felipe Aguirre is the former mayor of Maywood, California. He is a registered Democrat.

As of August, 2010, Mr. Aguirre is being investigated by the FBI for possible municipal corruption.

Aguirre was elected to the Maywood City Council in 2005 and was the city's mayor in 2008. Aguirre graduated from California State University Dominguez Hills with a degree in Urban Studies and has served as a member of the Los Angeles County Democratic Party Central Committee in 1988–1992. Aguirre was the subject of a recall election on December 9, 2008, along with fellow council members Ana Rosa and Veronica Guardado. The recall was unsuccessful.

References

External links
Official Maywood website profile

Living people
Mayors of places in California
Greater Los Angeles Democratic Party politicians
People from Maywood, California
Year of birth missing (living people)